In molecular biology, Prostate androgen-regulated transcript 1 (non-protein coding), also known as PART1 is a long non-coding RNA. In humans, the PART-1 gene is located on chromosome 5q12. It is highly expressed in the human prostate gland. Its expression in prostate cancer cells is increased in response to androgens. It has been suggested that this gene may play a role in prostate carcinogenesis.

See also
 Long noncoding RNA

References

Non-coding RNA